Connor Evans may refer to:

 Connor Evans (footballer), Welsh footballer
 Connor Evans (rugby union), South African rugby union player